Common Law Cabin (original title How Much Loving Does a Normal Couple Need?) is a 1967 exploitation film directed by Russ Meyer. The movie features Alaina Capri and Meyer regulars Babette Bardot and Jack Moran.

Plot
Dewey Hoople (Jack Moran) runs a broken down tourist trap along the Colorado River along with his French wife Babette (Babette Bardot) and his daughter Coral (Adele Rein). Business is so bad that Hoople must pay a local alcoholic (Frank Bolger as "Cracker") to entice tourists, called "suckers", to spend some time and money there.

Cast
 Babette Bardot as Babette
 Frank Bolger as Cracker
 Alaina Capri as Sheila Ross
 John Furlong as Dr. Martin Ross
 Andrew Hagara as Laurence Talbot III
 Jackie Moran as Dewey Hoople
 Adele Rein as Coral Hoople
 Ken Swofford as Barney Rickert

Production
It was co-written by Russ Meyer and Jack Moran, and filmed on location on the Colorado River in Arizona. Other portions of the film were shot in the Coachella Valley, California.

Reception
Roger Ebert later wrote the film, along with Good Morning and Goodbye, was "not among Meyer's best later work. The plots are too diffuse to maintain dramatic tension, the acting is indifferent, and there is an uncharacteristic amount of aimless dialogue. In retrospect, however, these films can be seen as Meyer's gradual disengagement from plot."

See also
List of American films of 1967

References

External links
 
 
Common Law Cabin at TCMDB

1967 films
1960s English-language films
1960s exploitation films
Films directed by Russ Meyer
Films shot in California
Incest in film
American exploitation films
Films with screenplays by Russ Meyer
1960s American films